WIMS is an AM Station broadcasting on 1420 kHz in Michigan City, Indiana, and serves the northwest Indiana listening area. Its format is primarily classic hits music, news, talk and sports. The station is currently owned by Gerard Media, LLC.

WIMS has been broadcasting live from Michigan City since 1947, having begun broadcasting August 8 of that year on 1420 kHz with 1 kW power (daytime only). It was licensed to Northern Indiana Broadcasters Inc. Most recently it is run by Ric Federighi and his brothers of Gerard Media LLC.

WIMS is an affiliate of the Grand Valley State Laker football radio network.

WIMS is also broadcast over two translators, W236BD 95.1 in Michigan City, and W294CY 106.7 in Valparaiso.

References

External links
WIMS official website

IMS
Radio stations established in 1947
News and talk radio stations in the United States
Michigan City, Indiana
1947 establishments in Indiana